USS Madgie was a steam gunboat acquired by the Union Navy during the American Civil War. She was used by the Navy to patrol navigable waterways of the Confederacy to prevent the South from trading with other countries.

Madgie, a wooden screw steamer, was built at Philadelphia, Pennsylvania, in 1858 and purchased by the Navy at New York City on 15 October 1861 for service in the South Atlantic Blockading Squadron, Acting Master F. B. Meriam in command.

Service with the South Atlantic Blockade 

After fitting out, Madgie arrived at Port Royal, South Carolina, 19 April 1862 to patrol southern waters, and steamed off Lawford Channel, Georgia, in May.

She sank a vessel carrying 3,000 barrels of rice off Barrett's Island 20 June, and captured schooner Southern Belle the same day. In September Madgie was off Sepolo, Georgia, until ordered to Doboy's Island to relieve  30 October.
 
After repairs at Port Royal in March 1863, Madgie spent the year off St. Catherine's Sound, capturing 15 persons from the steamer Ocanee 21 August.

Madgie sinks off Frying Pan Shoals 

Madgie sank in heavy seas in the Atlantic Ocean off Frying Pan Shoals, North Carolina, on 11 October 1863 while under tow by the screw steamer . At the time of her sinking, her Acting Master was Woodbury H. Polleys of Portland, ME.

References 

Ships of the Union Navy
Ships built in Philadelphia
Gunboats of the United States Navy
Steamships of the United States Navy
1858 ships
Shipwrecks of the American Civil War
Shipwrecks of the Carolina coast
Shipwrecks in the Atlantic Ocean
Maritime incidents in October 1863